Mariana Constantin (born 3 August 1960) is a retired Romanian artistic gymnast. She won a team silver medal at the 1976 Olympics.

References

1960 births
Living people
Romanian female artistic gymnasts
Gymnasts at the 1976 Summer Olympics
Olympic gymnasts of Romania
Olympic silver medalists for Romania
Olympic medalists in gymnastics
Medalists at the 1976 Summer Olympics
20th-century Romanian women